Karel Kovář (born 11 September 1996), commonly known as Kovy, is a Czech YouTube personality, vlogger and former let's player. He started his YouTube career in 2012 at the age of 16, at his first channel called Gameballcz, focused mainly on let's plays and parodies. In 2014, he founded a new channel called Kovy (his own nickname), focused on vlogging and infotainment videos. He became famous for his originality and difference from other Czech YouTubers.

Born in Pardubice, Czech Republic on 11 September 1996. He grew up in his home town. At the age of 20 years, he moved to the country's capital Prague. His content became known for its originality and focusion on more serious topics, such as politics or generation gap.

Personal life
Kovy was born and raised in Pardubice, Czech Republic. In 2016, he took a matura exam consisting of history and social sciences and moved to Prague, Czech Republic to join the Faculty of Social Sciences, Charles University to study marketing communications and public relations. However, he left the university after 3 semesters, stated he rather wants to focus on YouTube and other projects. He also works as a television presenter in the Televize Seznam.

Kovy's book Ovšem (meaning About Everything and Of Course simultaneously) was published in 2017. He came out as gay in the book. His partner has been czech stylist Miroslav Romaniv since 2019.

YouTube
He owns 4 YouTube channels, and records videos regularly for one of them – the main channel called Kovy.

He is different from other Czech YouTubers mainly in the case of video topics. His content is based on infotainment system. So, his videos are very often focused on politics, internet danger, prejudices of the society, generation gap, and others.

In 2016, he won an award called the Blogger of The Year. Forbes Magazine marked him as 17th most influential Czech person of social media. In 2017, he received 20th place in the „30 under 30“ rankings, marking him as 20th most talented Czech under 30 years of age.

In 2017, he was chosen as one of 3 young YouTubers from Europe (together with Abdel El Vrai from Belgium and Diana zur Löwen from Germany) to ask Jean-Claude Juncker four questions he wants. Kovy asked Juncker about European Union–Turkey relations, migration crisis, expensive moving of the European Parliament between Brussels and Strasbourg and relations between the EU and youth.

References

1996 births
Living people
Czech YouTubers
Czech LGBT entertainers
Czech gay men
People from Pardubice
Charles University alumni